Renner de Souza Silva (born 24 February 2000), commonly known as Renner, is a Brazilian footballer who plays as a left back for Prudente-SP.

Career statistics

Club

Notes

References

2000 births
Living people
Brazilian footballers
Association football fullbacks
Campeonato Brasileiro Série B players
UAE Pro League players
Fluminense FC players
Figueirense FC players
Al Jazira Club players
Expatriate footballers in the United Arab Emirates
Brazilian expatriate sportspeople in the United Arab Emirates
Sportspeople from Goiânia